James Franks (born December 26, 1972 in Mooreville, Mississippi) was the Chairman of the Mississippi Democratic Party and a Democratic member of the Mississippi House of Representatives, representing the state's 19th district from 2000 through 2007. His district included Lee, Itawamba and Tishomingo Counties.

He was the Democratic nominee for the office of Lieutenant Governor in the 2007 General Election, but was defeated by Republican State Auditor Phil Bryant on November 6, 2007.  Bryant won with 59 percent of the vote.

The Mississippi Clarion-Ledger named Franks as a potential candidate in the special election to fill the seat of resigned U.S. House member Roger Wicker but Franks declined to run.

Franks is a native of Mooreville, Mississippi and is an attorney.  He was married to the former Alisa Parkman of Hinds County, and they have two sons.  He is a member of the Church of God.

References

External links 
 Mississippi State Legislature - Representative Jamie Franks official MS Senate website
 Jamie Franks for Lt. Governor official campaign website
 Project Vote Smart - Representative Jamie Franks (MS) profile
 Follow the Money - Jamie Franks
 2005 2003 1999 campaign contributions

1972 births
Living people
Democratic Party members of the Mississippi House of Representatives
Mississippi lawyers
People from Lee County, Mississippi
State political party chairs of Mississippi
University of Mississippi alumni
21st-century American politicians